David Gorman (1926 - 1987) was an American jockey in Thoroughbred racing born in Elmont, New York, home to Belmont Park racetrack where in 1951 he would win the most important race of his career.

In April 1942, Dave Gorman rode his first winner. In 1946, he was the first jockey to hire the inexperienced Lenny Goodman as his agent. Goodman would go on to a highly successful career, counting as clients star riders such as Braulio Baeza, Steve Cauthen, Bill Hartack, John L. Rotz, Bobby Ussery, among others.

Among Gorman's most important wins were the 1949 Santa Anita Handicap, the 1951 Metropolitan Handicap, and that year's Jockey Club Gold Cup, which he won again in 1952, as well as the Whitney Stakes and Wood Memorial Stakes in 1952.

However, it would be in the third leg of the U.S. Triple Crown in his hometown that would be the high point of his career in which he rode C.V. Whitney's Counterpoint to victory on June 16, 1951 Belmont Stakes.

References

1926 births
1987 deaths
American jockeys
Sportspeople from Nassau County, New York
People from Elmont, New York